A brainstem glioma is a cancerous glioma tumor in the brainstem. Around 75% are diagnosed in children and young adults under the age of twenty, but have been known to affect older adults as well. Brainstem gliomas start in the brain or spinal cord tissue and typically spread throughout the nervous system.

Signs and symptoms
Common symptoms include, but are not necessarily limited to:
 Lack of facial control (droopy eyelids)
 Double vision
 Headache or headache that gets better after vomiting
 Nausea and vomiting
 Weakness and fatigue
 Seizures
 Balance problems
 Numbness in face
Symptoms can develop slowly and subtly and may go unnoticed for months. In other cases, the symptoms may arise abruptly. A sudden onset of symptoms tends to occur with more rapidly growing, high-grade tumors.

Cause
The cause is still unknown. Researchers have not found any direct genetic link.

Diagnosis
Neuroimaging, such as MRI, is the main diagnostic tool for brain stem gliomas. In very rare cases, surgery and biopsy are performed.

Treatment
Unlike most brain tumors, brainstem glioma is not often treated with neurosurgery due to complications in vital parts of the brain. More often, it is treated with chemotherapy and/or radiation therapy (though past use of radiation therapy has yielded mixed results).

However, these treatments do produce side effects; most often including nausea, the breakdown of the immune system, and fatigue. Hair loss can occur from both chemotherapy and radiation, but usually grows back after chemotherapy has ceased. Steroids such as Decadron may be required to treat swelling in the brain. Decadron can lead to weight gain and infection. Patients may also experience seizures, which need to be treated to avoid complications. For some patients there is a chance of a neurological breakdown; this can include, but is not limited to, confusion and memory loss.

The use of topotecan has been investigated.

There are several new clinical trials in process. One such trial is dendritic cell immunotherapy which uses the patient's tumor cells and white blood cells to produce a chemotherapy that directly attacks the tumor.

Prognosis
Brainstem glioma is an aggressive and dangerous cancer.  Without treatment, the life expectancy is typically a few months from the time of diagnosis.  With appropriate treatment, 37% survive more than one year, 20% survive 2 years. and 13% survive 3 years. This is not for all brainstem glioma, this statistic reflects DIPG.  There are other brainstem gliomas.

Research

Tumour Tissue Analysis 
 Children's National Medical Center, Washington DC: Comprehensive Protein Analysis (Proteomic Profiling) of Pediatric Brainstem Gliomas using Paraffin Embedded Tissues
 Memorial Sloan Kettering Cancer Center: Our hypothesis is that unravelling the genomic alterations of diffuse infiltrating pontine gliomas or DIPGs will lead to improved understanding of the biology of such tumours and improved therapeutic options.
 National Institutes of Health: DNA Analysis of Tumor Tissue Samples using Paraffin-Embedded Blocks from Patients with Diffuse Pontine Glioma
St. Jude Children's Research Hospital:Our goal is to perform an extensive genetic analysis of tumor samples obtained from patients with DIPG.
 St. Jude Children's Research Hospital:Gene sequencing project discovers mutations tied to deadly brain tumors in young children
 UCLA's Jonsson Comprehensive Cancer Center:New system uses nanodiamonds to deliver chemotherapy drugs directly to brain tumors
 UT Southwestern Medical Center:Researchers identify a switch that controls growth of most aggressive brain tumor cells
 The Institute of Cancer Research, London:Genetic flaw may hold key to deadly childhood brain tumour
 Patrick Couvreur, Professor and Director of the Physical Chemistry, Pharmacotechnology and Biopharmacy Unit at Paris-Sud University in France:Fighting cancer with nanotechnology
 The Hospital for Sick Children, Toronto, Canada: Genetics of Paediatric Brain Stem Gliomas
 University of California, San Francisco: Central Nervous System Development and Brainstem Glioma Tumorigenesis
 VU University Medical Center - Amsterdam (the Netherlands): implementation of a multi-institutional diffuse pontine glioma autopsy protocol

Imaging Research 
 Children's Hospital Los Angeles: Pilot Study|Predicting response to radiation therapy by evaluating choline levels with MRS before and after radiotherapy
 Children's of Los Angeles: Imaging Study|Impact of steroids on metabolism of tumours (animal research)
 DIPG Registry:

See also
 Diffuse intrinsic pontine glioma

Footnotes

References
 Foer, Dana R, and Paul G. Fisher. "Brain Stem Gliomas in Childhood." Brain Tumor Types and Imaging. The Childhood Brain Tumor Foundation. 23 Oct. 2008.
 "Brain Stem Gliomas." Brain Tumor Society. 25 Oct. 2008.
 "Brain Stem Glioma." Tumor Types. National Brain Tumor Foundation. 25 Oct. 2008.
 Landolfi, Joseph, and Anita Venkataramana. "Brainstem Gliomas : Article by Joseph Landolfi." eMedicine (Aug. 29 2006): 24 Oct. 2008.
 Phuphanich, Surasak. "Immunotherapy for Patients With Brain Stem Glioma and Glioblastoma." 1 Dec. 2007. ClinicalTrials.gov. 23 Oct. 2008.

External links 

Nervous system neoplasia